Ballagh is a townland in the civil parish of Mullingar in County Westmeath, Ireland.

The townland is located in the north-east of Mullingar town, a large junction between the N4 and the N52 roads stands at the centre of the townland.

References 

Townlands of County Westmeath